Thyrotomy may also refer to the cutting or biopsy the thyroid gland.
Thyrotomy (also called thyroidotomy, median laryngotomy, laryngofissure or thyrofissure) is an  incision of the larynx through the thyroid cartilage.

See also
Laryngotomy
Cricothyrotomy
Tracheotomy
 List of surgeries by type

References
 Dorland's Illustrated Medical Dictionary

Larynx surgery
Otorhinolaryngology